The  is an automobile nameplate used by the Japanese automobile manufacturer Daihatsu since 1984 for three different SUV models:

 Daihatsu Rocky (F70), an export version of the Rugger sold between 1984 and 2002
 Daihatsu Rocky (F300), a ladder frame-based mini SUV sold in Japan and some international markets between 1989 and 2002
 Daihatsu Rocky (A200), a subcompact crossover sold since 2019

Rocky
Cars introduced in 1984